Anguissola is a crater on Mercury. Its name was adopted by the International Astronomical Union (IAU) on August 4, 2017. Anguissola is named for the Italian painter Sofonisba Anguissola.

Anguissola lies on the western rim of the larger crater Henri.  To the southeast is the smaller crater Anyte, nearer the center of Henri.

References

Impact craters on Mercury
Sofonisba Anguissola